The Ecomusee du fier monde is a museum about the industrial and working-class people of South Central Montreal, Canada, one of the city's oldest neighbourhoods.  The museum is in the Bain Genereux, an art deco former indoor public bath, modeled on one in Paris and built in the 1920s. It is located at 2050 rue Atateken.
The name translates to "Ecomuseum of the Proud People".

References

Data taken from Magazine Musees Montreal 2008.09.

External links
Museum website

Museums in Montreal
History museums in Quebec
Industry museums in Canada
Art Deco architecture in Canada
Swimming venues in Quebec
Defunct sports venues in Canada
Ville-Marie, Montreal